The Magnificent Matador is a 1955 American drama film directed by Budd Boetticher and written by Budd Boetticher and Charles Lang. The film stars Maureen O'Hara, Anthony Quinn, Manuel Rojas, Richard Denning, Thomas Gomez, Lola Albright, William Ching and an early appearance of Stuart Whitman. The film was released on May 24, 1955, by 20th Century Fox.

Plot

Cast 
Maureen O'Hara as Karen Harrison
Anthony Quinn as Luís Santos
Manuel Rojas as Rafael Reyes
Richard Denning as Mark Russell
Thomas Gomez as Don David
Lola Albright as Mona Wilton
William Ching as Jody Wilton 
Eduardo Noriega as Miguel
Stuart Whitman as Man in the Arena
Lorraine Chanel as Sarita Sebastian
Anthony Caruso as Emiliano
Jesus 'Chucho' Solorzano as himself
Joaquín Rodríguez 'Cagancho' as himself
Rafael Rodríguez as himself
Antonio Velasquez as himself
Jorge 'Ranchero' Aguilar as himself

Production
Budd Boetticher said he wrote the film for Quinn who had "won two Academy Awards, and he couldn't get a job. So I wrote a script, and the studio changed the title to The Magnificent Matador, which is about the worst title you can imagine. He was typed; he couldn't get work, so I wrote a script in which he was the star. Maureen O'Hara played the opposite lead; she was great, the greatest lady I ever worked with. The picture was OK, but I was happier about what it did for Anthony Quinn. We put him in a that gold suit, and he was a star! He wasn't a star in Viva Zapata (1952), he was a character actor, and The Magnificent Matador made him a star of the first magnitude."

References

External links 
 

1955 films
20th Century Fox films
American drama films
CinemaScope films
1955 drama films
Films directed by Budd Boetticher
Films scored by Raoul Kraushaar
1950s English-language films
1950s American films